Tre Lux (also known as Tré Lux) is the solo trip hop project of Tina Root, the vocalist of Switchblade Symphony.

A Strange Gathering
Her first full-length album, A Strange Gathering, was released September 19, 2006.  It is composed of cover songs.

 "Never Let Me Down Again" – Depeche Mode cover – 4:24
 "Come Away with Me" – Norah Jones cover – 5:20
 "Wild Horses" – The Rolling Stones cover – 3:06
 "Yellow" – Coldplay cover – 4:43
 "The Chauffeur" – Duran Duran cover – 4:13
 "I Know There's Something Going On" – Anni-Frid Lyngstad (a.k.a. Frida) cover – 4:42
 "What's On Your Mind (Pure Energy)" – Information Society cover – 3:49
 "Black Hole Sun" – Soundgarden cover – 4:42
 "Karma Police" – Radiohead cover – 3:55
 "(Every Day Is) Halloween" – Ministry cover – 4:17
 "Run" – Snow Patrol cover – 6:02
 "Bad Trash" – Switchblade Symphony cover – 4:31

Website/MySpace Downloads
The following songs were released on TreLux.com or the project's MySpace page in the early-mid 2000's.

 "Frosty" - A cover of Frosty the Snow Man
 "Movement"
 "South Side (song)" - Moby cover - 4:03 This Song was also later released on a Moby Tribute album titled Replay: A Tribute to Moby
 "Stop"

External links
Official website
Official MySpace page

American electronic music groups
Trip hop groups